The 1957 Open Championship was the 86th Open Championship, played 3–5 July at the Old Course in St Andrews, Scotland. Bobby Locke, age 39, won his fourth and final Open title, three strokes ahead of runner-up Peter Thomson, who had won the three previous Opens.

The Open, last played at the Old Course just two years prior, was originally scheduled for Muirfield, but the "Suez Crisis" in Egypt in late 1956 led to serious fuel shortages in Britain and rationing of petrol. In early 1957, the Royal and Ancient decided that St Andrews, on a railway line, would be an easier place for players and spectators to get to than Muirfield, and so it was moved. Petrol rationing ended in May 1957 but it was then too late to switch back to the original venue and Muirfield was allocated the 1959 edition.

Qualifying took place on 1–2 July, Monday and Tuesday, with 18 holes on the Old Course and 18 holes on the New Course. With an entry of 295, compared to the record 360 entries the previous year, qualifying was in pairs rather than the three-balls used in 1956. The number of qualifiers was limited to a maximum of 100, and ties for 100th place were not included. Bernard Hunt and Bobby Locke led the qualifiers at 137; the qualifying score was 149 and 96 players advanced to the opening round on Wednesday.

There were fifteen American entries, many of them amateurs, but only four qualified for the  field of 96: professionals  and Frank Stranahan finished in the top twenty and the two amateurs missed the cut.

During the first round on Wednesday, competitors playing behind Middlecoff demonstratively complained of his slow play. They officially protested to the R&A, which sided with Middlecoff, who had completed his 18-hole round with Antonio Cerdá in three hours and 18 minutes. The maximum number of players making the cut after 36 holes was set at fifty, and ties for 50th place were not included.

This was the first Open Championship in which the leaders after 36 holes went off last for the final 36 holes. Previously a random draw had been used. Flory Van Donck and Eric Brown, the leading two players after 36 holes were paired together in the final group for the final two rounds.

A mini-controversy surrounded the ending of the championship. Lying two, Bobby Locke was only  from the cup on the 72nd hole when he moved his ball marker one putter-head length to avoid the line of fellow competitor Bruce Crampton's putt. After Crampton holed out, Locke forgot to replace his ball to its original position and sank his putt. Only much later were officials made aware of Locke's mistake; the Championship Committee decreed that no advantage had been gained and that the result, and Locke's three-stroke victory, stood. Australian golfer Peter Thomson was reportedly the person who informed officials of the infraction. Thomson was watching the end of the event on television that night and noticed the mistake. Though Locke still won, the incident "caused a deep divide between Thomson and Locke who had been good friends."

Card of the course

^ The 10th hole was posthumously named for Bobby Jones in 1972

Past champions in the field

Made the cut

Missed the cut

Round summaries

First round
Wednesday, 3 July 1957

Source:

Second round
Thursday, 4 July 1957

Source:
Amateurs: Smith (–1), Galloway (+2), Joe Carr (+6), Shepperson (+7), Sinclair (+7),Butler (+8), Texier (+8), Will (+8), Lawrie (+9), Andrews (+10), Allan (+12), Reid (+12), Keck (+21).

Third round
Friday, 5 July 1957 - (morning)

Source:

Final round
Friday, 5 July 1957 - (afternoon)

Source:
Amateurs: Smith (–2), Galloway (+12).

References

External links
St Andrews 1957 (Official site)

The Open Championship
Golf tournaments in Scotland
Open Championship
Open Championship
Open Championship